Kell House, at 502 North Mulberry Street in Tallulah, Louisiana, was built in 1910 by descendants of a planter family.  It was listed on the National Register of Historic Places on June 23, 1988.

It is a "rambling" two-story Queen Anne and Colonial Revival style house which stands out architecturally relative to the usual residences in Tallulah.  It has a 20-bay wraparound Tuscan gallery which is "easily the most architecturally impressive residential gallery in Tallulah."

See also
 National Register of Historic Places listings in Madison Parish, Louisiana

References

Houses on the National Register of Historic Places in Louisiana
Queen Anne architecture in Louisiana
Colonial Revival architecture in Louisiana
Houses completed in 1910
Madison Parish, Louisiana